This Ulster and Delaware station, branch MP 9.8, was at the summit of a grade that went to the Stony Clove Notch, where the Stony Clove Valley narrowed and was but a few yards wide. It was a flagstop, where people would have to signal a train to stop for them. This station never made much business, and was immediately taken out of service when the New York Central took over the U&D on February 1, 1932. It was also a house, and a U&D employee lived there who would walk from Edgewood station to Kaaterskill Junction station to check for fires.

Bibliography

References

External links
Ulster and Delaware Railroad Historical Society map

Railway stations in the Catskill Mountains
Former Ulster and Delaware Railroad stations
Railway stations in Greene County, New York
Former railway stations in New York (state)
Railway stations closed in 1940